Spidean Mialach (996 m) is a mountain in the Northwest Highlands, Scotland, situated on the northern shore of Loch Quoich in Inverness-shire.

One of a pair of two Munros (the other being Gleouraich), it is often climbed in conjunction with its neighbour. Starting in the south,  a number of stalkers paths make this one of the easier mountains to climb in the Northwest, despite its isolation.

References

Mountains and hills of the Northwest Highlands
Marilyns of Scotland
Munros